Kehinde Phillip “Kenny” Aladefa (born 19 December 1974) is a Nigerian track and field athlete who competed in 400 metres hurdles at the 1996 Summer Olympics and won a silver and bronze medal at the All-Africa Games in 1995 and 1999.

Personal best: 110 meter hurdles - 13.58 seconds, 
personal best: 400 meter hurdles - 49.60 seconds.

He graduated from the University of Southern California with a degree in biological sciences.  He competed in grand prix races. He then attended St. Matthew's University School of Medicine in the Cayman Islands and graduated in 2005 with a degree in Doctor of Medicine.

References

External links
sports-reference

1974 births
Living people
Yoruba sportspeople
21st-century Nigerian medical doctors
Nigerian male hurdlers
Athletes (track and field) at the 1996 Summer Olympics
Olympic athletes of Nigeria
University of Southern California alumni
St. Matthew's University alumni
African Games silver medalists for Nigeria
African Games medalists in athletics (track and field)
African Games bronze medalists for Nigeria
Athletes (track and field) at the 1995 All-Africa Games
Athletes (track and field) at the 1999 All-Africa Games
Twin sportspeople
Nigerian twins
Yoruba physicians
Fraternal twins